Ivan Silayev (born January 21, 1996) is a Russian professional ice hockey player. He is currently playing with Zvezda Moscow in the Supreme Hockey League (VHL) while under contract to the CSKA Moscow of the Kontinental Hockey League (KHL).

On October 30, 2014, Silayev made his Kontinental Hockey League debut playing with HC CSKA Moscow during the 2014–15 KHL season.

References

External links

1996 births
Living people
Admiral Vladivostok players
HC CSKA Moscow players
Russian ice hockey forwards
Ice hockey people from Moscow